The Jordan River Bridge is a two-lane bridge crossing the Jordan River within the greater area of Hobart, Tasmania, Australia.
The bridge's main function is to carry East Derwent Highway traffic, as well as pedestrians who travel between Bridgewater and Gagebrook.

External links
 Basic bridge stats

Bridges in Hobart
Road bridges in Tasmania